Homoeosoma costalbella is a species of snout moth in the genus Homoeosoma. It was described by Hans Georg Amsel in 1954 and is known from Iraq.

References

Moths described in 1954
Phycitini